Hasketts Creek is a  long 3rd order tributary to the Deep River in Randolph County, North Carolina.  Hasketts Creek is the only stream of this name in the United States.  Hasketts Creek is listed as non-supporting and as having an impaired biological community.

Course
Hasketts Creek rises in Asheboro in Randolph County, North Carolina and then flows north-northeast to join the Deep River about 0.25 miles north of Central Falls, North Carolina.

Watershed
Hasketts Creek drains  of area, receives about 46.9 in/year of precipitation, and has a wetness index of 393.36 and is about 32% forested.

References

Rivers of North Carolina
Rivers of Randolph County, North Carolina